Bennis v. Michigan, 516 U.S. 442 (1996), was a decision by the United States Supreme Court, which held that the innocent owner defense is not constitutionally mandated by Fourteenth Amendment Due Process in cases of civil forfeiture.

Background 
Tina B. Bennis was a joint owner, with her husband, of an automobile.  Detroit police arrested her husband, John Bennis, after observing him engaged in a sexual act with a prostitute in the automobile while it was parked on a Detroit city street. In declaring the automobile forfeit as a public nuisance under Michigan's statutory abatement scheme, the trial court permitted no offset for petitioner's interest despite her lack of knowledge of her husband's activity. The Michigan Court of Appeals reversed but was, in turn, reversed by the Michigan Supreme Court, which concluded, among other things, that Michigan's failure to provide an innocent owner defense was without federal constitutional consequence under this Court's decisions.

See also
 List of United States Supreme Court cases, volume 516
 List of United States Supreme Court cases
 Lists of United States Supreme Court cases by volume
 List of United States Supreme Court cases by the Rehnquist Court
 Nebraska v. One 1970 2-Door Sedan Rambler (Gremlin)

Sources

External links

United States Supreme Court cases
United States Supreme Court cases of the Rehnquist Court
United States civil forfeiture case law
1996 in United States case law
Takings Clause case law
Legal history of Michigan
Prostitution law in the United States
History of Detroit